Marcus Leon Buggs (born September 21, 1985) is a former American football linebacker. He was signed by the Buffalo Bills as an undrafted free agent in 2008. He played college football at Vanderbilt.

External links
Buffalo Bills bio
Vanderbilt Commodores bio

1985 births
Living people
American football safeties
American football linebackers
Vanderbilt Commodores football players
Buffalo Bills players
Chicago Bears players
People from Nashville, Tennessee
Players of American football from Tennessee